Chung Uk Tsuen is a village in Lam Tsuen, Tai Po District, Hong Kong.

Administration
Chung Uk Tsuen is a recognized village under the New Territories Small House Policy.

References

External links

 Delineation of area of existing village Chung Uk Tsuen (Tai Po) for election of resident representative (2019 to 2022)
 Historic Building Appraisal: Si Tak Chung Ancestral Hall, Chung Uk Tsuen, Tai Po
 Pictures of Si Tak Chung Ancestra Hall, Chung Uk Tsuen

Villages in Tai Po District, Hong Kong
Lam Tsuen